Kleidocerys resedae, the birch catkin bug, is a species of seed bug in the family Lygaeidae. It is found in Europe and Northern Asia (excluding China) and North America.

Subspecies
These four subspecies belong to the species Kleidocerys resedae:
 Kleidocerys resedae flavicornis (Duda, 1885)
 Kleidocerys resedae fuscomaculatus Barber, 1953
 Kleidocerys resedae geminatus (Say, 1831)
 Kleidocerys resedae resedae (Panzer, 1793)

References

Further reading

External links

 

Lygaeidae
Articles created by Qbugbot
Hemiptera of Asia
Hemiptera of Europe
Hemiptera of North America
Insects described in 1797
Taxa named by Georg Wolfgang Franz Panzer